Parliamentary elections were held in Greece on 7 March 2004. The New Democracy Party of Kostas Karamanlis won the elections, ending eleven years of rule by PASOK. PASOK was led into the elections by George Papandreou, who succeeded retiring Prime Minister Costas Simitis as party leader in February.

Leaders
Greek politics is strongly dynastic. Kostas Karamanlis is the nephew of Konstantinos Karamanlis, who was six times (1955, 1956, 1958, 1961, 1974, 1977) Prime Minister and twice President of Greece (1980–1985, 1990–1995), and the founder of New Democracy after the restoration of democracy in 1974. George Papandreou is the son of Andreas Papandreou, three times (1981, 1985, 1993) Prime Minister and the founder of PASOK, and the grandson of Georgios Papandreou, a liberal centrist who entered national politics in the 1920s and was twice Prime Minister (1944, 1963). Athens daily Kathimerini quoted a voter during the campaign as saying: "We Greeks like to know where our leaders come from. We feel we know these families as well as we know our own."

The campaign
In January New Democracy was leading PASOK in opinion polls by 7%. But Papandreou's election to the party leadership allowed PASOK to regain ground. During February Papandreou campaigned on "the need for change" in Greece, hoping to neutralise the strong sentiment for a change of government. By late February New Democracy's lead in the opinion polls had been cut to 3%.

The Athens daily Kathemerini commented: "Now, two weeks before the elections, all opinion polls show PASOK 3 to 4.5 percentage points behind ND. This raises the question of whether PASOK can snatch victory away from ND. The fact is that much is unclear. For example, although PASOK has little support, its leader has a good image in public opinion polls."

The electoral campaign concluded on in the traditional manner, with huge televised mass rallies in the centre of Athens by each of the major parties. On the evening of 4 March Karamanlis addressed an estimated 200,000 at the ND's concluding rally. PASOK claimed that twice that number attended their rally on 6 March, but these numbers cannot be independently verified. At the ND rally, Karamanlis said that PASOK had been in power too long and had grown lazy and corrupt. At the PASOK rally, Papandreou evoked the memory of his father but said that he would lead a government dedicated to reform and change, as well as action against corruption.

Since publication of opinion polls is banned in the last two weeks of Greek election campaigns, it was not possible to predict the outcome of the election, except to say that ND appeared to have been leading when the last polls were published, and that most commentators expected the result in terms of votes to be close. Greek electoral law ensures, through a complex algorithm of parliamentary seat redistribution, that a party polling a plurality of the vote (that is, more than any other party but also more than 40%) is practically guaranteed a majority in Parliament.

A "threshold" of 3% of the total popular vote is also required by law for a party to be eligible for representation in Parliament.  This provision kept all but the four top-polling parties from securing parliamentary seats.

Results
The result of the election was not as close as observers expected. It appears that ND regained its earlier lead over PASOK in the two weeks after the last opinion polls, and that the election of George Papandreou as PASOK leader was not sufficient to overcome the desire of the electorate for a change after a long period of PASOK rule.

References

Sources
https://web.archive.org/web/20120722093442/http://www.ypes.gr/el/Elections/NationalElections/Results/nationallectures2004/

Parliamentary elections in Greece
2004 in Greek politics
Greece
Legislative
Greek